Mürsəlli (also, Myursali and Myursalli) is a village and municipality in the Imishli Rayon of Azerbaijan.  It has a population of 872.

References 

Populated places in Imishli District